Richard Anthony Barone (October 13, 1932 – April 23, 2015) was an American professional baseball player. A shortstop and second baseman, he played for a decade in minor league baseball, and appeared in three Major League Baseball (MLB) games with the 1960 Pittsburgh Pirates. He was the grandfather of former major league pitcher Daniel Barone.

Biography
Barone was in his eighth season of professional baseball when the Pittsburgh Pirates called him up in September 1960, when MLB active rosters expanded to 40 players.  He had batted .204 in 143 games played for the Triple-A Columbus Jets of the International League. The 1960 Pirates were en route to their first National League title since .  Barone debuted as a pinch runner for 42-year-old player-coach Mickey Vernon on September 22 in the ninth inning of a 2–2 game against the Chicago Cubs, but did not score in a contest eventually won by Pittsburgh, 3–2 in 11 innings.  The Pirates clinched the pennant three days later, on September 25.

On September 27, Barone started his only major league game. Playing shortstop against the Cincinnati Reds, he played errorless ball in the field, handling five chances, and went hitless in five at bats and five plate appearances against the Reds' pitchers Bob Purkey, Orlando Peña and Cal McLish. It was another extra-inning game: Barone played the first 13 innings before he was removed for pinch hitter Smoky Burgess.  The Pirates prevailed, 4–3, in 16 innings.

On September 30, Barone appeared in his last major league contest as a late-inning defensive replacement, also making a fly ball out in one at bat against Bob Buhl of the Milwaukee Braves.  He was not on the Pirates' 1960 World Series roster.

Barone played two more seasons of minor league baseball before retiring after the 1962 campaign.

References

External links

1932 births
2015 deaths
Baseball players from San Jose, California
Billings Mustangs players
Columbus Jets players
Great Falls Electrics players
Hawaii Islanders players
Major League Baseball shortstops
New Orleans Pelicans (baseball) players
Pittsburgh Pirates players
Salt Lake City Bees players
San Diego Padres (minor league) players
Williamsport Grays players